The Iglesia de Caguach (in English, Church of Caguach) is a Catholic church located on the island of Caguach, in the commune of Quinchao on the Chiloé Archipelago, southern Chile.

The Church of Caguach was declared a National Monument of Chile in 2000 and is one of the 16 Churches of Chiloé that were declared UNESCO World Heritage Sites on 30 November 2000.

In 1919, the original Church of Caguach was destroyed completely by a fire, and rebuilt in 1925 by local inhabitants using wood, the material used in the original structure. This was the third church built in Caguach.

Its patron saint is Jesus of Nazareth, also the patron saint of the Church of Aldachildo, whose feast day is celebrated on August 30 and also on the third Sunday of January. This is the most important religious holiday of the Chiloé Archipelago, having been established originally in 1778 and encouraged by Spanish Franciscan missionary Fray Hilario Martínez, and the Church of Caguach forms the center of festivities, which involve music, dancing and processions. The image carried during the festivities represents Jesus during the Passion as he carries the cross, dressed in a purple robe and wearing a crown of thorns.

References 

Wooden churches in Chile
Churches in Chiloé Archipelago
World Heritage Sites in Chile
Colonial architecture in Chile
Roman Catholic churches completed in 1925
20th-century Roman Catholic church buildings in Chile